HNF may refer to:

 Hanford (Amtrak station), in California, United States
 Head normal form
 Hednesford railway station, in England
 Heinz Nixdorf MuseumsForum, in Paderborn, Germany
 Hepatocyte nuclear factor
 Hermite normal form
 Hesse normal form
 Hoosier National Forest, in Indiana, United States
 Hydrazinium nitroformate